Alison Thomson (born 3 May 1996 in Twickenham) is a Scottish professional squash player. She achieved a career-high ranking of 65 in September 2017. As of January 2020, she was ranked number 2 in Scotland and 73 in the world, and has competed in 65 professional tournaments. She has also regularly played in the Premier Squash League. She has also represented Scotland in international competitions including the Commonwealth Games.

References

1996 births
Living people
Scottish female squash players
Competitors at the 2017 World Games